The two battles of the Bruch (Spanish: Batallas del Bruch; Catalan: Batalles del Bruc) were engagements fought successively, on 6 and 14 June 1808, during the Peninsular War, by French troops commanded by Brigadier General François de Schwarz and General of Division Joseph Chabran against Spanish volunteers and mercenaries led by General Antoni Franch i Estalella and Joan de la Creu Baiget.

The result of these battles and actions fought at El Bruc, near Barcelona, Catalonia, was a Spanish victory.

Background
The Dos de Mayo Uprising, earlier that year, had put Iberia in revolt against French rule.

June 6
The French detachment of 3,800 soldiers under General of Brigade François Xavier de Schwarz left Barcelona on June 4, advancing in the direction of Saragossa–Lleida. A rainstorm that day slowed their march considerably; the delay gave time for local Spanish forces, composed of militia from the neighboring villages, volunteers (sometent), and Swiss and Walloon soldiers from the Barcelona garrison (2,000 men), to mobilize for action. The Spaniards were led by General Antoni Franch i Estalella and deployed along the Bruc Pass.

The resulting stand was a success, and the French under General Schwarz were turned back to Barcelona with the loss of 360 dead, 800 wounded, 60 prisoners, and one gun captured. The Spanish also captured a French Imperial Eagle.

French army

 Schwartz Column - Brigadier-General Francis Xavier Schwartz, Commander-in-Chief
 1st Regiment Neapolitan of the line (2 battalions - 1940 men)
 2nd Line Regiment Switzerland (3rd battalion - 580 men)
 2nd Regiment of the line (3rd battalion - 610 men)
 1st Regiment of Chasseurs Neapolitan (2 squadrons - 160 men)
 3rd Regiment Provisional cuirassiers (1 squadron - 100 men)
 11th Italian artillery company (section 1 - 2 guns)

Spanish forces
 General Antoni Franch i Estalella, Commander-in-Chief
 260 regulars and militia (Captain José Viñas)
 200 regulars and militia (Francesc Riera Balaguer)

June 14
A second French sortie on June 14, led by General of Division Joseph Chabran, succeeded only in putting to the torch several buildings in El Bruc after having been defeated and repelled by the Spanish forces led by Joan Baiget. The following day, the Spanish attacked the French in their painful withdrawal to Barcelona, inflicting more than 500 dead and wounded on Chabran's troops.

French army
 First Division - General of Division Joseph Chabran, Commander-in-Chief
 Brigade: Brigadier-General Goulas
 7th Regiment of the line (2 battalions - 1785 men)
 16th Regiment of the line (3rd battalion - 789 men)
 Brigade: Brigadier-General Nicolas
 2nd Regiment of the line (3rd battalion - 610 men)
37th Regiment of the line [3rd battalion - 789 men)
 56th Regiment of the line (4th Battalion - 833 men)
 93th Regiment of the line (3rd battalion - 792 men)

Spanish forces
 Commander Joan Baget, Commander-in-Chief
 Four companies of volunteers (soldiers of Extremadura regiment and militia)
 Wallon Guards
 Swiss regiment Wimpffen (300 men)
 300 militia (Antoni Franch)
 100 militia (Captain José Viñas)
 Sallen residents (60 men led by the vicar Ramón Mas)
 Patriots (100 men)
 5 guns

Aftermath
The Spanish conventional warfare proceeded with the Battle of Girona.

See also
 Chronology of events of the Peninsular War
 Drummer of El Bruc

Notes

References

Further reading

External links

Battles of the Peninsular War
Battles in Catalonia
Battles involving Spain
Battles involving France
Battles involving Italy
Battles of the Napoleonic Wars
Conflicts in 1808
1808 in Spain
June 1808 events